Coffs Harbour, locally nicknamed Coffs, is a city on the Mid North Coast of New South Wales, Australia,  north of Sydney, and  south of Brisbane. It is one of the largest urban centres on the North Coast, with a population of 78,759 as per 2021 census. The Gumbaynggirr are the original people of the Coffs Harbour region.

Coffs Harbour's economy was once based on timber and agriculture. Over recent decades, tourism has become an increasingly important industry for the city. Once part of a region known as the Bananacoast, today the tourist city is part of a wider region known as the Coffs Coast.

The city has a campus of Southern Cross University, and a campus of Rural Faculty of Medicine University of New South Wales, a public and a private hospital, several radio stations, and three major shopping centres. Coffs Harbour is near numerous national parks, including a marine national park.

There are regular passenger flights each day to Sydney, Melbourne and Brisbane departing from Coffs Harbour Airport. Coffs Harbour is also accessible by road, by NSW TrainLink, and by regular bus services.

Geography
Coffs Harbour is a regional city along the Pacific Highway between Newcastle and the Gold Coast. It has become a major service centre for those living between South West Rocks in the south and Grafton to the north.

The surrounding region is dominated by coastal resorts and apartments with hinterland hills and mountains covered by forests, banana and blueberry plantations, and other farms. It is the only place in New South Wales where the Great Dividing Range meets the Pacific Ocean.

The greater Coffs Harbour city is broken up into several suburb and precinct areas, including:
 Red Hill
 South Coffs
 West Coffs
 Coffs Harbour Jetty
 Park Beach
 Diggers Beach
 Korora, West Korora
 Sapphire Beach
 Moonee Beach
 Emerald Beach
 North Boambee Valley
 Boambee, Boambee East
 Toormina
 Sawtell
 Bonville

The city is surrounded by many towns and villages in the Coffs Coast region, including:
 Coramba
 Nana Glen
 Corindi Beach and Red Rock
 Karangi
 Ulong
 Upper Orara
 Woolgoolga

History

The traditional inhabitants of the Coffs Harbour region are the Gumbaynggirr people, who have occupied the land for thousands of years, forming one of the largest coastal Aboriginal nations in New South Wales. Their nation stretches from the Nambucca River in the south to around the Clarence River in the north and to the Great Dividing Range in the west.

By the early 1900s, the Coffs Harbour area had become an important timber production centre. Before the opening of the North Coast railway line, the only way to transport large items of heavy but low value, such as timber, was by coastal shipping. This meant sawmillers on the North Coast were dependent on jetties either in rivers or off beaches for exporting their timber. Timber tramways were constructed to connect the timber-getting areas, the sawmills and jetties built into the ocean at Coffs Harbour.

Etymology
Coffs Harbour owes its name to John Korff, who named the area Korff's Harbour when he was forced to take shelter from a storm in the area in 1847. The name was accidentally changed by the surveyor for the crown when he reserved land in the area during 1861.

Heritage listings 
Coffs Harbour has a number of heritage-listed sites, including:
 1 Breakwater Road: Ferguson's Cottage
Coffs Harbour timber jetty, Jordan Esplanade

Demographics
According to the 2021 Census the population of suburban Coffs Harbour is 27,089. This is an increase from 25,752 in 2016. 52.6% of the population is female in contrast to the national average of 50.7%. The average age is 43, which is higher than the national average of 38. Aboriginal and Torres Strait Islander people made up 5.6% of the population.

75.5% of residents reported being born in Australia; higher than the national average of 66.7%. Other than Australia the most common countries of birth are England (3.2%), New Zealand (1.3%), Myanmar (1.1%), India (0.9%) and Germany (0.5%). 62.2% of residents also reported both their parents being born in Australia, considerably higher than the national average of 47.3%. 82.1% of people spoke only English at home.

The top religious affiliations in Coffs Harbour are Catholic 20.0%, Anglican 17.9% and Presbyterian and Reformed 3.9%. 29.3% declared no religion and 11.1% did not submit a response.

Climate 
Coffs Harbour has a humid subtropical climate (Cfa according to the Köppen climate classification system) with marked seasonality of rainfall. The city is relatively sunny, receiving 122.1 clear days annually, higher than Brisbane and Cairns but not as sunny as Townsville. Summers are moderately hot, wet and humid. Winters are mild with moderate rainfall.

Attractions

Coffs Harbour was the hub for a thriving banana industry. One of the biggest attractions is the Big Banana, one of the first of Australia's Big Things (it celebrated its 50th birthday in 2015), with the World's Largest Banana celebrating the region's best-known export. There is also a popular underwater diving spot on a small natural reef.

The Coffs Harbour Jetty is an historically important timber wharf where coastal shipping once moved the timber from the hinterland. It was listed on the NSW State Heritage Register on 25 June 2021, recognising its significance "as the longest coastal timber jetty built by the Harbours and Rivers Section of the NSW Public Works department in the 19th century." The jetty area is the subject of planning from 2018 by Council and consultants to develop a cultural precinct and rejuvenated residential area.

Nearby, the Solitary Islands Marine Park preserves a diverse underwater ecosystem that mirrors the terrestrial biodiversity, covering the southern limit of northern tropical species and the northern limits of the southern temperate species. Muttonbird Island is accessible by walking along the breakwater from the harbour, with the nature reserve protecting a significant wedge-tailed shearwater breeding site. The Muttonbird Island footpath leads to a viewing platform where whales are often spotted between June and November.

There are many national parks, reserves and marine parks surrounding the city, including:
 Bellinger River National Park (west of Bellingen in the Bellinger headwaters)
 Bindarri National Park (20 km west of the city, near Ulong and Dairyville)
 Bongil Bongil National Park (south of Sawtell)
 Cascade National Park (north of Dorrigo)
 Coffs Coast Regional Park (beachside reserves and parks along the Coffs Coast)
 Dorrigo National Park (just south of the Dorrigo township)
 Hayden Dent Nature Reserve (northwest of Coffs Harbour)
 Junuy Juluum National Park (north of Dorrigo)
 Moonee Beach Nature Reserve (Moonee Beach-Emerald Beach)
 Nymboi-Binderay National Park (north of Dorrigo, east of Glenreigh, on the Nymboida River)
 Solitary Islands Marine Park (in the Tasman Sea from Coffs Harbour to Wooli)
 South Solitary Island (18 km NE from Coffs Harbour in the Marine Park)
 Ulidarra National Park (Bruxner Park and Mount Coramba area)
 Yuraygir National Park (stretching from Yamba to Red Rock and west along the Coast Range)

The town's water supply comes from the nearby Orara River at Cochranes Pool and is supplemented by the Nymboida River. The city hosts the Coffs Harbour Regional Botanic Garden.

Education
Coffs Harbour is home to the Coffs Harbour Education Campus (CHEC) which is a partnership between the Southern Cross University, TAFE and the Coffs Harbour Senior College.
Other universities include the University of New South Wales Rural Clinical School located on the Coffs Harbour Health Campus. Australian Catholic University, Rural Education (REZ).
Local state and private high schools include Coffs Harbour, Woolgoolga, Orara, Toormina, John Paul College, Coffs Harbour Christian Community, Bishop Druitt College and the Coffs Harbour Senior College.

Primary schools include; Boambee, Bonville, Coffs Harbour Public, Coramba, Corindi, Crossmaglen, Karangi, Kororo, Lowanna, Mullaway, Nana Glen, Narranga, Upper Orara, Sandy Beach, Sawtell, Toormina, Tyalla, Ulong, William Bayldon and Woolgoolga Public School. Private primary schools in the area include; Mary Help of Christians, St Augustine's and St Francis Xavier's.

Defunct primary schools
 Brooklana Public – 1920–49
 Bucca Central Public – 1910–63
 Bucca Lower Public (Formerly Bucca Creek until May 1919) – 1896–1978
 Corindi Creek Public – 1920–62
 Timmsvale Public – 1928–70
 Yalbillinga Special School (Amalgamated with Coffs Harbour PS) – 1965–93

Other schools
 Casuarina School for Steiner Education
 Bishop Druitt College
 Coffs Harbour Bible Church School
 Coffs Harbour Christian Community School
Special schools are public schools designed for children or youth with chronic disabilities or who for other reasons cannot be accommodated in the comprehensive school system. Coffs Harbour Learning Centre is available for these students.

Bypass
The Pacific Highway cuts through the centre of the city. Work has commenced to build a  deviation. The project was approved in November 2020.

Local media

Newspapers
 News Of The Area - Printed and on-line publications.
 Coffs Coast Advocate – The Advocate newspaper was until 2019 published on Wednesdays and Saturdays and delivered free to all homes. The newspaper is now online only. An online index of articles between 1993 and 2004 and selected articles dating back to 1900 is maintained by the Coffs Harbour City Library, though only articles relating to Coffs Harbour and its people are indexed.

Historical:
 Coffs Coast Independent – Weekly full-colour newspaper delivered free each Thursday to all homes in the Coffs Harbour district, closed 2012.

Television
 ABC, ABC TV Plus, ABC Me, ABC News (public broadcaster)
 SBS, SBS Viceland, SBS Food, NITV (multicultural commercial broadcaster)
 Nine (NBN Television), 9Gem, 9Go!, 9Life (Nine Entertainment owned and operated)
 Seven (formerly Prime7), 7two, 7mate, 7Bravo, 7flix (Seven Network owned and operated affiliate)
 10, 10 Bold, 10 Peach, - (Owned by WIN Corporation), (Network 10 affiliate)
 Sky News Regional

Of the three main commercial networks:
NBN Television airs NBN News, a regional hour-long program including opt-outs for the Mid North Coast, every night at 6pm. It is broadcast from studios in Newcastle with reporters based at a local newsroom in the city.
Prime7 News airs a half-hour local news bulletin for the North Coast at 6pm each weeknight. It is broadcast from studios in Canberra with reporters based at a local newsroom in the city.
WIN Television airs short local news updates throughout the day, broadcast from its Wollongong studios.

Radio

Commercial
 2HC 639 AM and 100.5 FM – talkback, news - including local, national & international; sport; and music. Part of the Broadcast Operations Group's Super Network relaying a majority of programs from 2SM in Sydney and 2HD in Newcastle. The station was purchased by Bill Caralis in 2005.
 Triple M 106.3 FM – Part of Southern Cross Austereo, Triple M has limited local content - with shows such as Moffee For Breakfast, as well as networked programming - like The Ray Hadley Morning Show, and The Marty Sheargold Show. The station was formerly known as 2CS FM until 15 December 2016.
 Hit 105.5 (105.5 FM) – Part of Southern Cross Austereo, Hit 105.5 has a local Coffs Harbour Breakfast Show called the A.B & Ben Show. It began in 1997 as a third commercial licence for the Coffs Coast. The station was formerly known as Star FM until 15 December 2016.

Government
 Triple J 91.5 FM
 Radio National 99.5 FM
 ABC Classic 97.9 FM
 ABC Coffs Coast 92.3 FM
 ABC NewsRadio 90.7 FM

Community
 CHY FM 104.1 CHY FM website
 Racing Radio 107.1 FM
 2AIR FM 107.9 2AIR website

Narrowcast
 RawFM 88.0 FM

Transport

Bus
Beaumonts, Busways, Forest Coach Lines, Newcombe and Sahdras all run service throughout Coffs Harbour and the surrounding areas. Greyhound Australia and Premier Motor Service long-distance coach services which run along the east coast also stop at Coffs Harbour.

Forest Coach Lines runs frequent buses to the northern suburbs of Coffs Harbour and some less frequent services to Grafton.

Most of the Beaumonts buses in 2011 were bought by Newcombe, originally Beaumonts bus service ran in the Orara Valley carrying high school and primary school students from the city of Coffs Harbour to their rural homes.

Train
Coffs Harbour is serviced by NSW TrainLink. Three northbound and three southbound XPT trains stop at Coffs Harbour station each day.

Taxis 
Local taxis are run by Holiday Coast Transportation and operate as 13cabs.

Air travel 
Coffs Harbour Airport is regularly serviced by Link Airways, Qantas and Regional Express. The passenger terminal is accessible via Hogbin Drive.

The Coffs Harbour Aero Club on Aviation Drive supports private pilots. Flying lessons and discovery flights, as well as air-work and charter flights are available from the club, which is also working closely with local high schools to provide flying training for students.

Sport
The most popular sport in Coffs Harbour is Rugby league. The city has four clubs in the Country Rugby League of NSW's Group 2 rugby league competition; Coffs Harbour Comets, Sawtell Panthers, Woolgoolga Seahorses, and Orara Valley Axemen. All clubs offer entries in age groups ranging from under-7s to first grade. The Sawtell Panthers are the current champions in first grade and under-18s, and Woolgoolga Seahorses were runners up to the Port Macquarie Sharks in reserve grade.

Rugby League Clubs in Coffs Harbour
 Coffs Harbour Comets
 Orara Valley Axemen
 Sawtell Panthers
 Woolgoolga Seahorses

There is a local Australian rules football competition with three clubs in the city; Coffs Harbour, Northern Beaches-Woologoolga and Sawtell Saints.

There is also a men's and women's soccer league, two rugby union clubs (Coffs Harlequins and Southern Cross University), junior and senior basketball competitions and the representative Coffs Suns, field hockey and netball competitions.

In 2001, Coffs Harbour hosted the Oceania region's qualification matches for the 2002 FIFA World Cup. One these matches played at Coffs Harbour was the Australia 31–0 American Samoa game, which set a new world record for international association football's biggest-ever win.

Pacific Bay Resort hosted 'Camp Wallaby' throughout the 2000s, in which the Wallabies called Coffs Harbour home.

The 2007 and 2013 City vs Country Rugby League representative fixtures were held in Coffs Harbour.

The city is home to the Coffs Harbour International Stadium, which has hosted FIFA World Cup Qualifiers and a Women's 2008 Beijing Olympics Qualification fixtures for the Matildas in soccer as well as some National Rugby League (NRL) pre-season fixtures and domestic one day cricket matches. Coffs Harbour is also known for a great place to skydive due to the hinterland views where The Great Dividing Range meets the sea.

The region has hosted international rallying through the 1970s through to the early 1980s. After that time, the events became part of the Australian Rally Championship and NSW Rally Championships. It was the host city for Rally Australia, a round of the World Rally Championship in 2011. The rally used roads from the neighboring Bellingen, and Nambucca shires in addition to Coffs Harbour. The rally returned permanently to Coffs Harbour in 2013. In 2016, the rally was run in November with a Super special Stage at the Coffs Jetty. It was last held in 2018.

Coffs Harbour is home to three locally grown sporting events attracting thousands of competitors each year: the Coffs Harbour Triathlon (bcu Coffs Tri), the Coffs Harbour running festival and the Coffs Ocean Swims, all raising money to local children's charities.

Notable residents
 Attila Abonyi – former Australian international Association football player who was capped 61 times for the Socceroos
 Liz Cambage – basketball player
 Russell Crowe – actor
 Jon English – singer-songwriter-actor
 Michael Ennis – rugby league footballer and sportscaster 
 Kevin Gordon – rugby league footballer
 Clint Greenshields – rugby league footballer
 David Helfgott – concert pianist
 Deborah Knight – radio host and news journalist for the Nine Network
 Wendy Matthews – singer
 Mark McGowan – 30th Premier of Western Australia
 Luke Metcalf – rugby league footballer
 Emma Moffatt – triathlete, Beijing Olympics bronze medalist
 Tom Mooney – rugby league footballer
 David Mullane – rugby league footballer
 George Negus – author, journalist, and current affairs presenter
 Ben Newton – Paralympics gold medalist, wheelchair rugby player
 Melinda Pavey - NSW state politician
 Dick Smith – entrepreneur
 Jack Thompson – AFI award-winning actor

Annual events
 National Touch League (March)
 "International Charity Football Match", August 9, proceeds go to Wesley Mission for local homeless youth
 Ella7s (Australia's largest Indigenous Rugby Carnival) (March)
 Coffs Coast International Buskers Festival (October)
  Harmony Festival (March)
 Rally Australia (November)
 STILL: National Still Life Award (November)

References

Further reading
 Aboriginal history of the Coffs Harbour region / compiled by Coffs Harbour City Library by Liz Thomas (2013)
 Coffs Harbour: Vol I: pre-1880 to 1945 / Neil Yeates (1990)
 Coffs Harbour: Vol II: 1946 – 1964 / Neil Yeates (1990)
 Coffs Harbour 100 years down the track / by Jean Donn-Patterson (not dated)
 The Coffs Harbour story (1976)
 The history of Coffs Harbour / Produced by Friends of Tourism & Coffs Harbour Historical Society (not dated)
 The Natural history of the Coffs Harbour District / Dept of Continuing Education, North Coast Regional Office, U.N.E. (1980)
 Remembering Coff's Harbour: a century of photographs / [edited by Arlene Hope and David Townsend] (2001)
 Ships and timber: a short history of Coffs Harbour port and associated railways / John Kramer (1984)

External links

 
 Coffs Harbour City Council
 Our Stories: Coffs Coast Heritage

 
Cities in New South Wales
Coastal cities in Australia
Marinas in Australia
Mid North Coast
City of Coffs Harbour